Ricarda-Huch-Preis is a literary prize of Hesse. It has been awarded by the City of Darmstadt.

Winners 

1978 Friedrich Luft
1981 Marcel Reich-Ranicki
1984 Siegfried Unseld
1987 Herta Müller
1990 Martin Walser
1993 Adolf Muschg
1996 Alexander Kluge
1999 Ignatz Bubis
2002 František Černý
2005 Orhan Pamuk
2008 Hanna Krall
2011 Sibylle Lewitscharoff
2015 Barbara Honigmann
2018 Ferdinand von Schirach
2021 Petra Reski

External links
 

Literary awards of Hesse